Nanque S.A. is an Argentine sports equipment brand. The former manufacturing company was based in Banfield, Buenos Aires. Founded in 1969, its goal was to manufacture clothing and sportswear for professional and amateur sports, focusing on the association football market, where the company sponsored several teams not only in Argentina but in South and Central America. One of the Nanque's owners, Carlos Portell, was also president of Club Atlético Banfield from 1998 to 2012.

Overview 

Nanque was established in 1969 to produce sportswear for the most popular sports in Argentina, in a time the most international manufacturers were not doing business in the country so Nanque signed deals with some professional football teams, sharing sponsorships with other local brands such as Uribarri, Sportlandia and Olimpia. Nanque took a step as a manufacturer in the 1980s, where the company provide football uniforms for many teams of lower divisions (most of them in Primera B Metropolitana). Apart from football, Nanque also sponsored some notable boxers of Argentina, including world champions Juan Martín Coggi and Jorge Locomotora Castro.

In the 1990s, the company reached its peak when sponsoring some teams in Argentine Primera División, even starting operations outside Argentina to sponsor clubs in Uruguay, Colombia, Ecuador and El Salvador. Nevertheless, financial problems led the company to go into bankruptcy, moving its head office to Uruguay. Nevertheless, in 2012 the company closed and its factory on Hipólito Yrigoyen avenue in Banfield was expropriated by government agency ANSES which opened an administration unit there.

The brand was relaunched in the 2020s through an online shopping where former Nanque football products are offered.

Sponsorships

Football 
Clubs that wore uniforms by Nanque:

Clubs 

  Aldosivi (1991)
  All Boys (1992–94)
  Almirante Brown (1988–96)
  Alumni (VM)
  Alvarado
  Banfield (1982, 1986–95, 2001–08)
  Belgrano (1982, 1995–96)
  Brown (A)  
  Central Córdoba (R) 
  Central Norte (1998–2007)
  Chaco For Ever (1988–90)
  Cipolletti
  Claypole
  Colón (1982–92)
  CAI (CR) (2009–11)
  Comunicaciones (2006–07)
  Defensa y Justicia (1989–94, 2006–09)
  Defensores Unidos
  Deportivo Español (1982–83)
  El Porvenir 
  Gimnasia y Esgrima (CU) 
  Godoy Cruz (2003–04)
  Los Andes (1985–88, 2004–06)
  San Lorenzo de Almagro (1989) 
  San Telmo
  Sarmiento (J) (1992–95)
  Talleres (RE) (1983–90)
  Temperley (1980–82, 1988–95)
  América de Cali (1995–96)
  Millonarios (1996)
  Deportivo Quito
  Municipal
  FAS
  Central Español
  Cerro (1984–91, 1996–99)
  Danubio (1994–96)
  Huracán Buceo (1995–96)
  Nacional (1992–93) 
  Peñarol (1991–96)
  Rampla Juniors (1994–95)
  El Tanque Sisley (1986–97, 2004–06)

Boxing 
Boxers sponsored by the firm were:
  Sergio Víctor Palma
  Juan Martín Coggi
  Juan Roldán
  Jorge Castro
  Hugo Luero
  Juan Carlos Sosa
  José M. Flores

References

External links 
 

Sportswear brands
Clothing brands of Argentina
Sporting goods manufacturers of Argentina
Defunct manufacturing companies of Argentina